The M249 light machine gun (LMG), also known as the M249 Squad Automatic Weapon (SAW), which continues to be the manufacturer's designation, and formally written as Light Machine Gun, 5.56 mm, M249, is the American adaptation of the Belgian FN Minimi, a light machine gun manufactured by the Belgian company FN Herstal (FN). 

The M249 is manufactured in the United States by the subsidiary FN Manufacturing LLC, a company in Columbia, South Carolina, and is widely used in the U.S. Armed Forces. The weapon was introduced in 1984 after being judged most effective (compared to a number of candidate weapons) to address the lack of automatic firepower in small units. The M249 provides infantry squads with a high rate of machine gun fire, combined with the accuracy and portability of a rifle.

The M249 is gas operated and air-cooled, it has a quick-change barrel (allowing the gunner to rapidly replace an overheated or jammed barrel), and a folding bipod attached to the front of the weapon (an M192 LGM tripod also being available). The SAW can be fed from both linked ammunition and STANAG magazines (such as those used in the M16 and M4), allowing the SAW operator to use them as a source of ammunition in case they run out of belts. The STANAG magazines should only be used in emergencies, however, due to their high malfunction rate.

M249s have seen action in major conflicts involving the United States since the U.S. invasion of Panama in 1989. In 2009, the U. S. Marine Corps selected the M27 Infantry Automatic Rifle, to partially replace the M249 in USMC service. In 2022, the U.S. Army selected the Sig Sauer XM250 to replace the M249.

Development

Background
In 1965, the U.S. Army and U.S. Marine Corps' primary machine guns were the M2 Browning and M60. The M2 was a large-caliber heavy machine gun, usually mounted on vehicles or in fixed emplacements. The M60 was a more mobile general-purpose machine gun, intended to be carried by troops to provide heavy automatic fire. 

Both firearms were very heavy and usually required a crew of at least two in order to operate efficiently. The Browning automatic rifle (BAR), the army's main individual machine gun since its introduction in World War I, was phased out in 1957 with the introduction of the M14 rifle (which had a fully automatic mode). "Designated riflemen" in every squad were ordered to use their weapons on the fully automatic setting, while other troops were required to use their rifle's semi-automatic mode on most occasions to increase accuracy and conserve ammunition. Because the M14 and M16 rifles had not been designed with sustained automatic fire in mind, they often overheated or jammed. The 20-round and 30-round magazines of these weapons limited their sustained automatic effectiveness when compared to belt-fed weapons.

The Army decided that an individual machine gun, lighter than the M60, but with more firepower than the M16, would be advantageous; troops would no longer have to rely on rifles for automatic fire. Through the 1960s, the introduction of a machine gun into the infantry squad was examined in various studies. While there was a brief flirtation with the concept of a flechette- or dart-firing Universal Machine Gun during one study, most light machine gun experiments concentrated on the Stoner 63 light machine gun, a modular weapon that could be easily modified for different purposes. The Stoner 63 LMG saw combat for a brief period in Vietnam with the Marine Corps, and later on a wider scale with the U.S. Navy SEALs.

In 1968, the Army Small Arms Program developed plans for a new 5.56 mm caliber LMG, though no funds were allocated (5.56 mm ammunition was viewed as underpowered by many in the armed forces). Studies of improved 5.56 mm ammunition, with better performance characteristics, began. The earliest reference to studies of other caliber cartridges for the LMG did not appear until 1969. In July 1970, the U.S. Army finally approved development of an LMG, with no specified caliber. At this time, the nomenclature "Squad Automatic Weapon" (SAW) was introduced. Actual design of alternative cartridges for the LMG did not begin until July 1971. A month later, Frankford Arsenal decided on two cartridge designs for the new LMG: a 6 mm cartridge and a new 5.56 mm cartridge with a much larger case. Neither design was finalized by March 1972, when the Army published the specifications document for the planned SAW. The 6 mm cartridge design was eventually approved in May that year. Prior to July 1972, SAW development contracts were awarded to Maremont, Philco Ford, and the Rodman Laboratory at Rock Island Arsenal. These companies produced designs with Army designations XM233, XM234 and XM235 respectively – X denoting "experimental". Designs were required to have a weight of less than 9.07 kg (20 lb) including 200 rounds of ammunition, and a range of at least 800 meters (2,600 ft).

Trials

When the time came for developmental and operational testing of the SAW candidates, three 5.56 mm candidate weapons were included with the 6 mm candidates: the M16 HBAR, a heavy-barrel variant of the M16 designed for prolonged firing; the Fabrique Nationale de Herstal (FN) Minimi; and the HK 23A1. The initial round of tests ended in December 1974. In February 1976, the Minimi and Rodman XM235 SAW were selected for further development. At this time, opinions of the 6 mm cartridge were beginning to sour due to the logistical implications of providing yet another ammunition type to the infantry. In June, it was requested that the SAW specifications document be revised to emphasize standard 5.56 mm ammunition. In October, the requested revisions were approved, and bids were solicited for the conversion of the Rodman XM235 to 5.56 mm. Production of the converted XM235 was awarded to Ford Aerospace, and its designation was changed to XM248. A new M16 HBAR variant, the XM106, was developed in 1978, and soon after, Heckler & Koch lobbied to include a 5.56 mm conversion of its HK 21A1 (instead of the standard 7.62 mm NATO ammunition it was built for) in future SAW testing. The latter model was designated the XM262. At this time, the Minimi received the designation XM249. Testing of the four candidates resumed in April 1979.

In May 1980, the FN XM249 was selected as the best choice for future development on the grounds of performance and cost, while the HK XM262 reportedly came a close second. In September, FN was awarded a "maturity phase" contract for further development of the XM249, and testing of the new weapon began in June 1981. The official adoption took place in February 1982.

Service

The new gun entered U.S. Army service as the M249 squad automatic weapon in 1984, and was adopted by the U.S. Marine Corps a year later. The U.S. production model has a different butt from that of the regular Minimi. It is manufactured in the FN factory in Columbia, South Carolina.

Although found to be reliable and accurate, the M249 was considered to present unacceptable hazards in the form of an exposed hot barrel and sharp edges. There were complaints that the front sight required special adjustment tools. On August 23, 1985, then-U.S. Under Secretary of the Army James R. Ambrose suspended M249 production pending the development of the product improvement program (PIP) intended to fix these problems. Congress deleted funds for the M249 from the Fiscal Year 1986 defense budget, then retroactively set aside the program's prior year's funds from the M249 program for other purposes, including retirement and pay raises. Over 1,100 M249s already issued were to remain in use, but be retrofitted with the PIP kit when it became available. Over 7,000 remaining M249s were to stay in storage at depots until corrective changes could be made. The PIP kit was eventually developed and implemented, and production of the M249 resumed. In 1994 the M249 squad automatic weapon was re-designated the M249 light machine gun.

Design details

The M249 is a belt-fed light machine gun. It fires the 5.56×45mm NATO cartridge, usually a combination of one M856 tracer and four M855 ball cartridges fed from M27 linked belts. Belts are typically held in a hard plastic or soft canvas box attached to the underside of the weapon. The M249 can also fire rifle grenades.

It fires from an open bolt and is gas operated. When the trigger is pulled, the bolt and bolt carrier move forward under the power of the recoil spring. A cartridge is stripped from the belt, chambered, and discharged, sending a bullet down the bore. Expanding propellant gases are diverted through a hole in the barrel into a chamber. This pressure moves a piston providing the energy to extract and eject the spent casing as well as advance the belt and compress the recoil spring, thus preparing for subsequent shots.

The M249’s air-cooled barrel is equipped with a mechanism to remove and replace the barrel assembly with a spare, this makes it easy for the operator to easily change the barrel on the field when it gets too hot during extensive amounts of fire. A folding bipod with adjustable legs is attached near the front of the weapon, though there are provisions for hard-mounting to a M192 Lightweight Ground Mount tripod or vehicle mount.

The M249’s original gas regulator featured two different gas port sizes, normal and adverse. The adverse setting increases the cyclic rate of fire from 700–850 rounds per minute to 950–1,150 rounds per minute and is used only in extreme environmental conditions or when heavy fouling is present in the weapon's gas tube. The two-position gas regulator was discarded as part of a product improvement program, which made the M249’s that received the product improvement kit no longer able to fire at the higher cyclic rate. The sustained rate of fire, the rate at which the gunner can fire continuously without overheating, is around 100 rounds per minute. Whilst the rapid rate of fire is around 200 rounds per minute.

Operational history

The M249 LMG entered service in 1984 as the M249 SAW. Initial reactions to the gun were mixed: it fulfilled the light machine gun role well when fired from the ground, but was not as effective when fired from the shoulder or hip. It was praised for its extreme durability and massive firepower, though a number of areas for improvement were highlighted: the blank firing attachment fitted poorly, the bipod was very weak and broke easily, the sling attachment was awkward, and there were many slots and gaps that accumulated dirt. Some claimed that the heavy-barrelled version of the M16 rifle was a more effective light machine gun.

The M249 SAW was not used heavily before the 1991 Gulf War, though it has been used in every major U.S. conflict since. American personnel in Somalia in 1993, Bosnia in 1994, Kosovo in 1999, Afghanistan in 2001 and Iraq since 2003 have been issued M249s. Surplus weapons were donated to Bolivia, Colombia and Tunisia.

Tactically, SAWs are either carried with a maneuvering unit and fired while handheld, or positioned to remain stationary and provide covering fire for other units. Upon introduction, the basic load of ammunition was 600 rounds, carried in three 200-round boxes. These boxes were carried in soft pouches named Case, Small Arms, Ammunition, 200-Round Magazine. The modern load of ammunition carried for the weapon is 1,000 rounds in five 200-round belts, although up to 500 extra rounds generally gets loaded into 100-round soft pouches.

Persian Gulf War
A supply of 929 M249 SAWs was issued to personnel from the U.S. Army and Marine Corps during the Persian Gulf War. Although exposure to combat was scarce, M249 gunners who were involved in fighting mainly used their weapons to provide cover fire for friendly maneuvering troops from fixed positions, rather than maneuvering with them. There were many complaints about the weapons clogging up with sand after prolonged use in the desert environment.

War in Afghanistan
The standard squad automatic weapon in Afghanistan is the M249 with PIP kit, which serves alongside its heavier counterpart, the M240 machine gun. Most M249s were given a collapsible buttstock immediately prior to the invasion to reduce its length and make the weapons more practical for parachuting and close-quarters combat. Special Operations troops typically favor the shorter Para version of the weapon, which weighs much less.

A report entitled Lessons Learned in Afghanistan was released by Lieutenant Colonel Charlie Dean and SFC Sam Newland of the U.S. Army Natick Soldier Center in 2002. They found that 54% of SAW gunners had problems maintaining their weapons, and 30% reported that the gun rusted easily. Soldiers reported ammunition boxes rattling and falling off. 80% percent of soldiers surveyed were pleased with the weapon's accuracy and lethality, yet only 64% claimed they were "confident in their weapon". Weapons clogging up with sand in the desert seems to be the main complaint.

Iraq War 

The PIP and Para versions of the M249 have been used in the Iraq war since the invasion. By 2004, many M249s had been in service for almost 20 years and were becoming increasingly unreliable. Soldiers were requesting replacements and new features, and there are reports of soldiers holding their weapons together with duct tape. The lethality of the 5.56 mm ammunition has been called into question by reports of enemy soldiers still firing after being hit multiple times. As in previous conflicts, the sandy environment causes the M249s and other weapons to clog up and jam if they are not cleaned frequently.

Operation Iraqi Freedom PEO Soldier Lessons Learned, a report on the performance of weapons in the Iraq War, was published by Lieutenant Colonel Jim Smith of the U.S. Army on May 15, 2003. Smith spoke positively of the M249, claiming that it "provided the requisite firepower at the squad level as intended". He praised the SPW variant, noting that its "short barrel and forward pistol grip allowed for very effective use of the SAW in urban terrain". At the National Defense Industrial Association in 2007, Lieutenant Colonel Al Kelly of the 1st Battalion, 17th Infantry gave a presentation describing the M249 as having "good range, excellent reliability" and an "excellent tracer". He said that a cloth pouch was preferred over the plastic box for holding linked ammunition, and that "knock-down power is poor, but is compensated by rate of fire".

In December 2006, the Center for Naval Analyses (CNA) released a report on U.S. small arms in combat. The CNA conducted surveys on 2,608 troops returning from combat in Iraq and Afghanistan over the past 12 months. Only troops who fired their weapons at enemy targets were allowed to participate. Three hundred forty-one troops were armed with M249 SAWs, making up 13 percent of the survey. 71 percent of M249 users (242 troops) reported that they were satisfied with the weapon. 40 percent of users preferred feeding the SAW with the soft 100-round pouch, while 21 percent chose the soft and hard 200-round pouches each. 60 percent (205 troops) were satisfied with handling qualities, such as handguards, size, and weight. Of those dissatisfied, just under half thought that it was too heavy. M249 users had the lowest levels of satisfaction with weapon maintainability at 70 percent (239 troops), most due to the difficulty in removing and receiving small components and poor corrosion resistance. The SAW had the highest levels of stoppages at 30 percent (102 troops), and 41 percent of those that experienced a stoppage said it had a large impact on their ability to clear the stoppage and re-engage their target. Sixty-five percent (222 troops) did not need their machine guns repaired while in theater. Sixty-five percent (222 troops) were confident in the M249's reliability, defined as level of soldier confidence their weapon will fire without malfunction, and 64 percent (218 troops) were confident in its durability, defined as level of soldier confidence their weapon will not break or need repair. Both factors were attributed to high levels of soldiers performing their own maintenance. 60 percent of M249 users offered recommendations for improvements. Seventeen percent of requests were for making the weapon lighter, and another 17 percent were for more durable belt links and drums, as well as other modifications, such as a collapsible stock.

Future replacement

An extensive maintenance program intended to extend the service lives of M249s has been carried out to refurbish rifles, especially units that suffered from wear due to heavy use. In particular the warping of the receiver rails on the early models was a defect that occurred in heavily used first-generation M249s. This defect however has been completely eliminated on later models and is no longer present on the current-issue M249, which has reinforced rails and full-length welding rather than spot welding. A replacement of the M249's buttstock that is redesigned to be adjustable in length is also available.

In 2009, the U.S. Marine Corps selected the M27 Infantry Automatic Rifle, a lighter, magazine-fed rifle to supplement and partially replace the M249. With plans to buy up to 4,100 IARs to complement and partially replace its 10,000 M249s (of which 8,000 will remain in service) held at platoon level, it acquired 450 of the Heckler & Koch HK416–based weapons for testing. The Marines started fielding the M27 in 2010, but kept both weapons in the inventory due to the M249's greater ammunition capacity and higher sustained fire rate; rifle companies are typically issued 27 IARs and six SAWs. The Army passed on the concept of the IAR, believing automatic rifle with a magazine would lower the effectiveness and firepower of a squad. While the Marine Corps has 13-man squads, the Army organizes its soldiers into squads of nine and needs considerably more firepower from the squad machine gunners to make up the difference.

The Army recognized the limitations of the M249 however, and in early 2017, the U.S. Army posted a notice soliciting bids for the Next Generation Squad Weapon-Automatic Rifle (NGSW-AR or NGSAR) to replace the M249. In July 2018, the Army awarded contracts to six companies including Textron, head of the preceding LSAT program where they made development leaps with cased telescoped (CT) ammunition, for NGSW-AR and ammunition prototypes. The stated requirements included:
 Maximum total length of 
 Compatible with next-generation Small Arms Fire Control systems

In April 2022, the U.S. Army selected Sig Sauer as the winner of the competition; their automatic rifle is designated the XM250.

Variants
M249 PIP Kit
The product improvement program kit replaced the original steel tubular stock with a plastic stock based upon the shape of the heavier M240 machine gun. The change in stocks allowed for the addition of a hydraulic buffer system to reduce recoil. In addition, the dual gas port settings were reduced to only one; variants with the product improvement kit can no longer fire at a higher cyclic speed. A handguard was added above the barrel to prevent burns, and the formerly fixed barrel changing handle was swapped for a folding unit. Certain parts were beveled or chamfered to prevent cutting soldiers' hands and arms. Other changes involved the bipod, pistol grip, flash suppressor, and sights. Over the years, additional modifications have been introduced as part of the Soldier Enhancement Program and Rapid Fielding Initiative. These include an improved bipod, 100– and 200–round fabric "soft pack" magazines (to replace the original plastic ammunition boxes), and Picatinny rails for the feed tray cover and forearm so that optics and other accessories may be added.

M249 Paratrooper
The M249 Paratrooper, often called "Para", is a compact version of the gun with a shorter barrel and sliding aluminum buttstock based on that of the Minimi Para, so-called because of its intended use by airborne troops.

M249 Special Purpose Weapon
The M249 Special Purpose Weapon is a lightweight and shorter version of the M249 designed to meet USSOCOM special operations forces requirements. The barrel changing handle, magazine insertion well, and vehicle mounting lug all have been removed to reduce weight. As a result, the SPW cannot be mounted in vehicles or use M16 magazines. Picatinny rails were added to the feed cover and forearm for the mounting of optics, lasers, vertical foregrips, and other M4 SOPMOD kit accessories. The SPW has a detachable bipod.

Mk 46
The Mk 46 is a variant of the M249 SPW that was adopted by USSOCOM. The program that led to both the Mk 46 and Mk 48 was headed by the US Naval Special Warfare Command (NAVSPECWAR). Like the SPW, the barrel changing handle, magazine insertion well, and vehicle mounting lugs have been removed to save weight. However, the Mk 46 retains the standard M249 plastic buttstock instead of the collapsible buttstock used on the SPW. The Picatinny rail forearm differs slightly from the SPW. The Mk 46 has the option of using the lighter SPW barrel or a thicker, fluted barrel of the same length.

Mk 48

This is a 7.62×51mm NATO version of the Mk 46, used by USSOCOM, when a heavier cartridge is required. It is officially classified as an LWMG (Light Weight Machine Gun) and was developed as a replacement for the Mk 43 Mod 0/1. The M60 based machine guns are a great deal more portable than the heavier M240 based designs used elsewhere in the US military in the infantry medium machine gun role. However, the M60 based designs have a long history of insufficient reliability. Trials conducted through the mid-1990s led the US Army to replace its M60 with the M240B GPMGs. The M240B, however, weighs in at ≈27.5 lb and is about 49" long with the standard barrel. NAVSPECWAR was reluctant to give up the increased portability of the M60 (≈22.5 lb, 37.7" OAL with the shortest "Assault Barrel") designs in spite of the M240's increased reliability. A request was put in for a new machine gun in 2001, and FN responded with a scaled-up version of the M249 weighing in at ≈18.5 lb with an OAL of ≈39.5". The new design achieved much better reliability than the M60-based weapons while bettering its light weight and maintaining the same manual of arms as the already in-use M249. USSOCOM was slated to begin receiving deliveries of the new gun in August 2003.

M249S
A semiautomatic variant manufactured for the civilian sport shooting and collector's market. Derived from the fully automatic military firearm, this version shares most of the major components of the military models with the exception of the firing mechanism and the addition of welded internal components to prevent conversion to a fully automatic mode. Notably, this version retains the ability to be belt fed, an uncommon feature in civilian firearms.

Users

Former users 
 : Standard issue light machine gun of the Afghan National Army

See also
 Daewoo Precision Industries K3
FN Minimi
Heckler & Koch MG4
 IWI Negev
 Third Arm Weapon Interface System
 QJS-161
RPL-20
 Ultimax 100
 PK machine gun

References

Sources

 
 
 
 
 
 
 
 
 
 
 
 
 
 
 
 
 
 
 
 
 

Government publications

External links

 FN M249 webpage by FN America
 FN M249 webpage by the U.S. Army
 FN M249 webpage by the FAS Military Analysis Network
 FN M249 webpage at Nazarian.no

5.56×45mm NATO machine guns
Cold War firearms of the United States
FN Herstal firearms
Gas-operated firearms
Squad automatic weapons
Machine guns of the United States
United States Marine Corps equipment
Weapons and ammunition introduced in 1984